NTLA can stand for:
National Transitional Legislative Assembly of Liberia
Northern Territory Legislative Assembly (Australia)
National Tax Lien Association